Liberalism and progressivism within Islam involve professed Muslims who have created a considerable body of progressive thought about Islamic understanding and practice. Their work is sometimes characterized as "progressive Islam". Some scholars, such as Omid Safi, differentiate between "Progressive Muslims" (post-colonial, anti-imperialist, and critical of modernity) and "Liberal advocates of Islam" (an older movement embracing modernity).

Liberal Islam originally emerged out of the Islamic revivalist movement of the 18th-19th centuries. Liberal and progressive ideas within Islam are considered controversial by some traditional Muslims, who criticize liberal Muslims on the grounds of being too Western and/or rationalistic.

The methodologies of liberal and progressive Islam rest on the re-interpretation of traditional Islamic sacred scriptures (the Quran) and other texts (the Hadith), a process called ijtihad (see below). This can vary from the slight to the most liberal, where only the meaning of the Quran is considered to be a revelation, with its expression in words seen as the work of the Islamic prophet Muhammad in his particular time and context.

Liberal Muslims see themselves as returning to the principles of the early Ummah and as promoting the ethical and pluralistic intent of the Quran. The reform movement uses monotheism (tawhid) "as an organizing principle for human society and the basis of religious knowledge, history, metaphysics, aesthetics, and ethics, as well as social, economic and world order".

Liberal Muslims affirm the promotion of progressive values such as democracy, gender equality, human rights, LGBT rights, women's rights, religious pluralism, interfaith marriage, freedom of expression, freedom of thought, and freedom of religion; opposition to theocracy and total rejection of Islamism and Islamic fundamentalism; and a modern view of Islamic theology, ethics, sharia, culture, tradition, and other ritualistic practices in Islam. Liberal Islam emphasizes the re-interpretation of the Islamic scriptures in order to preserve their relevance in the 21st century.

Background in Islamic philosophy 

The rise of Islam, based on both the transmission of the Quran and the life of Muhammad, strongly altered the power balances and perceptions of origin of power in the Mediterranean region. Early Islamic philosophy emphasized an inexorable link between religion and science, and the process of ijtihad to find truth—in effect, all philosophy was "political" as it had real implications for governance. This view was challenged by the "rationalist" Muʿtazilite philosophers, who held a more Hellenistic view, emphasizing reason above revelation, and as such are known to modern scholars as the first speculative theologians of Islam; they were supported by a secular aristocracy who sought freedom of action independent of the Caliphate. By the late ancient period, however, the "traditionalist" Ashʿarīte theology had in general triumphed in Islam. According to the Ashʿarītes, reason must be subordinate to the Quran and the sunnah.

Ibn Rushd 

Ibn Rushd, often Latinized as Averroes, was an Andalusian polymath. Being described as "founding father of secular thought in Western Europe", he was known by the nickname the Commentator for his precious commentaries on Aristotle's works. His main work was The Incoherence of the Incoherence in which he defended philosophy against al-Ghazali's claims in The Incoherence of the Philosophers. His other works were the Fasl al-Maqal and the Kitab al-Kashf. Ibn Rushd presented an argument in Fasl al-Maqal (Decisive Treatise) providing a justification for the emancipation of science and philosophy from official Ash'ari theology and that there is no inherent contradiction between philosophy and religion; thus Averroism has been considered a precursor to modern secularism. Ibn Rushd accepts the principle of women's equality. According to him they should be educated and allowed to serve in the military; the best among them might be tomorrow's philosophers or rulers. The 13th-century philosophical movement in Latin Christian and Jewish tradition based on Ibn Rushd's work is called Averroism. Ibn Rushd became something of a symbolic figure in the debate over the decline and proposed revitalization of Islamic thought and Islamic society in the later 20th century. A notable proponent of such a revival of Averroist thought in Islamic society was Mohammed Abed al-Jabri with his Critique de la Raison Arabe (1982).

Rifa'a al-Tahtawi 

In 1831, Egyptian Egyptologist and renaissance intellectual Rifa'a al-Tahtawi was part of the statewide effort to modernize the Egyptian infrastructure and education. They introduced his Egyptian audience to Enlightenment ideas such as secular authority and political rights and liberty; his ideas regarding how a modern civilized society ought to be and what constituted by extension a civilized or "good Egyptian"; and his ideas on public interest and public good. Tahtawi's work was the first effort in what became an Egyptian renaissance (nahda) that flourished in the years between 1860 and 1940.

Tahtawi is considered one of the early adapters to Islamic Modernism. Islamic Modernists attempted to integrate Islamic principles with European social theories. In 1826, Al-Tahtawi was sent to Paris by Mehmet Ali. Tahtawi studied at an educational mission for five years, returning in 1831. Tahtawi was appointed director of the School of Languages. At the school, he worked translating European books into Arabic. Tahtawi was instrumental in translating military manuals, geography, and European history. In total, al-Tahtawi supervised the translation of over 2,000 foreign works into Arabic. Al-Tahtawi even made favorable comments about French society in some of his books. Tahtawi stressed that the Principles of Islam are compatible with those of European Modernity.

In his piece, The Extraction of Gold or an Overview of Paris, Tahtawi discusses the patriotic responsibility of citizenship. Tahtawi uses Roman civilization as an example for what could become of Islamic civilizations. At one point all Romans are united under one Caesar but split into East and West. After splitting, the two nations see "all its wars ended in defeat, and it retreated from a perfect existence to nonexistence." Tahtawi understands that if Egypt is unable to remain united, it could fall prey to outside invaders. Tahtawi stresses the importance of citizens defending the patriotic duty of their country. One way to protect one's country according to Tahtawi, is to accept the changes that come with a modern society.

Muhammad Abduh 

Egyptian Islamic jurist and religious scholar Muhammad Abduh, regarded as one of the key founding figures of Islamic Modernism, broke the rigidity of the Muslim ritual, dogma, and family ties. Abduh argued that Muslims could not simply rely on the interpretations of texts provided by medieval clerics, they needed to use reason to keep up with changing times. He said that in Islam man was not created to be led by a bridle, man was given intelligence so that he could be guided by knowledge. According to Abduh, a teacher's role was to direct men towards study. He believed that Islam encouraged men to detach from the world of their ancestors and that Islam reproved the slavish imitation of tradition. He said that the two greatest possessions relating to religion that man was graced with were independence of will and independence of thought and opinion. It was with the help of these tools that he could attain happiness. He believed that the growth of western civilization in Europe was based on these two principles. He thought that Europeans were roused to act after a large number of them were able to exercise their choice and to seek out facts with their minds. In his works, he portrays God as educating humanity from its childhood through its youth and then on to adulthood. According to him, Islam is the only religion whose dogmas can be proven by reasoning. He was against polygamy and thought that it was an archaic custom. He believed in a form of Islam that would liberate men from enslavement, provide equal rights for all human beings, abolish the religious scholar's monopoly on exegesis and abolish racial discrimination and religious compulsion.

Muhammad Abduh claimed in his book Al-Idtihad fi Al-Nasraniyya wa Al-Islam that no one had exclusive religious authority in the Islamic world. He argued that the Caliph did not represent religious authority, because he was not infallible nor was the Caliph the person whom the revelation was given to; therefore, according to Abduh, the Caliph and other Muslims are equal. ʿAbduh argued that the Caliph should have the respect of the ummah but not rule it; the unity of the umma is a moral unity which does not prevent its division into national states.

Mohammad Abduh made great efforts to preach harmony between Sunnis and Shias. Broadly speaking, he preached brotherhood between all schools of thought in Islam. Abduh regularly called for better friendship between religious communities. As Christianity was the second biggest religion in Egypt, he devoted special efforts towards friendship between Muslims and Christians. He had many Christian friends and many a time he stood up to defend Copts.

Nasr Hamid Abu Zayd 

Egyptian Qur'anic thinker, author, academic Nasr Hamid Abu Zayd is one of the leading liberal theologians in Islam. He is famous for his project of a humanistic Qur'anic hermeneutics, which "challenged mainstream views" on the Qur'an sparking "controversy and debate." While not denying that the Qur'an was of divine origin, Zayd argued that it was a "cultural product" that had to be read in the context of the language and culture of seventh century Arabs, and could be interpreted in more than one way. He also criticized the use of religion to exert political power. In 1995 an Egyptian Sharia court declared him an apostate, this led to threats of death and his fleeing Egypt several week later. (He later "quietly" returned to Egypt where he died.)

According to scholar Navid Kermani "three key themes" emerge from Abu Zayd's work:

 to trace the various interpretations and historical settings of the single Qur'anic text from the early days of Islam up to the present;
 to demonstrate the "interpretational diversity" that exists within the Islamic tradition;
 and to show how this diversity has been "increasingly neglected" across Islamic history.

Abu Zayd saw himself as an heir to the Muʿtazila, "particularly their idea of the created Qurʿān and their tendency toward metaphorical interpretation."

Abu Zayd strongly opposed the belief in a "single, precise and valid interpretation of the Qur'an handed down by the Prophet for all times".

In his view, the Quran made Islamic Arab culture a `culture of the text` par excellence, but because the language of the Quran is not self-explanatory, this implied Islamic Arab culture was also a culture of interpretation. Abu Zayd emphasized "intellect" in understanding the Quran, as opposed to "a hermeneutical approach which gives priority to the narrated traditions [ hadith ]".

For Abu Zayd, interpretation goes beyond explanation or commentary, "for without" the Qur'an would not have meaning:

The [Qur'anic] text changed from the very first moment - that is, when the Prophet recited it at the moment of its revelation - from its existence as a divine text (nass ilahi), and became something understandable, a human text (nass insani), because it changed from revelation to interpretation (li-annahu tahawwala min al-tanzil ila al-ta'wil). The Prophet's understanding of the text is one of the first phases of movement resulting from the text's connection with the human intellect.Naqd al-hhitab al-dini, p. 93., translated by 

Abu Zayd's critical approach to classical and contemporary Islamic discourse in the fields of theology, philosophy, law, politics, and humanism, promoted modern Islamic thought that might enable Muslims to build a bridge between their own tradition and the modern world of freedom of speech, equality (minority rights, women's rights, social justice), human rights, democracy and globalisation.

Ali Shariati 

Ali Shariati Mazinani (Persian: علی شریعتی مزینانی,  23 November 1933 – 18 June 1977) was an Iranian revolutionary and sociologist who focused on the sociology of religion. He believed that Socialism was compatible with Islam and, in fact, that it was from the beginning. It seems that his eagerness to explore socialism began with the translation of the book Abu Zarr: The God-Worshipping Socialist by the Egyptian thinker Abdul Hamid Jowdat-al-Sahar (ar:عبد الحميد جودة السحار). According to this book, Abu Dhar was the very first socialist. Then, Shariarti's father declared that his son believed that the principles of Abu Dhar are fundamental. Even some thinkers described Shariati as the modern-day Abu Dhar in Iran. Of all his thoughts, there is his insistence on the necessity of revolutionary action. Shariati believed that Marxism could not provide the Third World with the ideological means for its own liberation. One of his premises was that Islam by nature is a revolutionary ideology. Therefore, Islam could relate to the modern world as an ideology. According to Shariati, the historical and original origin of human problems was the emergence of private ownership. He believed that in the modern era, the appearance of the machine was the second most fundamental change in the human condition. In fact, private ownership and the emergence of the machine, if considered one of two curves of history, belong to the second period of history. The first period is collective ownership. However, Shariati gave a critique of the historical development of religion and the modern philosophical and ideological movements and their relationship to both private ownership and the emergence of the machine.

In addition to socialism, he believed in women's rights, as evidenced in his book Fatima Is Fatima, where he argued that Fatima Zahra the daughter of the Islamic prophet Muhammad is as a role model for Muslim women around the world and a woman who was free. Also, he criticised Western liberal democracy for its direct relationship to the plundering of Third World nations and instead promoted Commitment Democracy. Commitment Democracy was, according to Shariati, the government of Imam Ali. For explaining better the commitment to democracy, he at first divides between two concepts. One of them is Syasat and the other is politic. Syasat is a philosophy by the government that want to have the responsibility of changing and becoming the society, not its being and existence. In fact, Syasat is a progressive and dynamic thing. The aim of the government in the philosophy of Syasat is to change social foundations, institutions and even all the norms of society namely culture, morality and desires etc. in simple word, Syasat want to make exist the people. On contrary, there is no making in politics. In other words, politics is the following of having people not making them. Of course, Shariati prefers Syasat on politics because the former is more progressive. He considers making human (Ensan Sazi). In fact, his utopia is constructed with three concepts of Gnosis, equality and freedom. Commitment democracy appeared out of his lecture in Hoseyniyeh Ershad; a famous lecture with the name of Ummah and Imamate. According to him, an Imam is one who wants to guide humans not only in political, social and economic dimensions but also in all existential dimensions. He believes that Imam is alive everywhere and every time. On one hand, Imamate is not a metaphysical belief but a revolutionary guide philosophy. He added that Imam has to guide people not according to his desire like a dictator but to Islamic ideology and authentic values.

Ijtihad

Ijtihad (lit. effort, physical or mental, expended in a particular activity) is an Islamic legal term referring to independent reasoning or the thorough exertion of a jurist's mental faculty in finding a solution to a legal question. It is contrasted with taqlid (imitation, conformity to legal precedent). According to classical Sunni theory, ijtihad requires expertise in the Arabic language, theology, revealed texts, and principles of jurisprudence (usul al-fiqh), and is not employed where authentic and authoritative texts (Qur'an and hadith) are considered unambiguous with regard to the question, or where there is an existing scholarly consensus (ijma). Ijtihad is considered to be a religious duty for those qualified to perform it. An Islamic scholar who is qualified to perform ijtihad is called a mujtahid.

Starting from the 18th century, some Muslim reformers began calling for abandonment of taqlid and emphasis on ijtihad, which they saw as a return to Islamic origins. Public debates in the Muslim world surrounding ijtihad continue to the present day. The advocacy of ijtihad has been particularly associated with Islamic modernists. Among contemporary Muslims in the West there have emerged new visions of ijtihad which emphasize substantive moral values over traditional juridical methodology.

Specific issues

Feminism 

A combination of Islam and feminism has been advocated as "a feminist discourse and practice articulated within an Islamic paradigm" by Margot Badran in 2002. Islamic feminists ground their arguments in Islam and its teachings, seek the full equality of women and men in the personal and public sphere, and can include non-Muslims in the discourse and debate. Islamic feminism is defined by Islamic scholars as being more radical than secular feminism, and as being anchored within the discourse of Islam with the Quran as its central text.

During recent times, the concept of Islamic feminism has grown further with Islamic groups looking to garner support from many aspects of society. In addition, educated Muslim women are striving to articulate their role in society.
Examples of Islamic feminist groups are the Revolutionary Association of the Women of Afghanistan, founded by Meena Keshwar Kamal, Muslim Women's Quest for Equality from India, and Sisters in Islam from Malaysia, founded by Zainah Anwar and Amina Wadud among other five women.

In 2014, the Selangor Islamic Religious Council (MAIS) issued a fatwa declaring that Sisters In Islam, as well as any other organisation promoting religious liberalism and pluralism, deviate from the teachings of Islam. According to the edict, publications that are deemed to promote liberal and pluralistic religious thinking are to be declared unlawful and confiscated, while social media is also to be monitored and restricted. As fatwas are legally binding in Malaysia, SIS is challenging it on constitutional grounds.

Human rights

Moderate Islamic political thought contends that the nurturing of the Muslim identity and the propagation of values such as democracy and human rights are not mutually exclusive, but rather should be promoted together.

Most liberal Muslims believe that Islam promotes the notion of absolute equality of all humanity, and that it is one of its central concepts. Therefore, a breach of human rights has become a source of great concern to most liberal Muslims. Liberal Muslims differ with their culturally conservative counterparts in that they believe that all humanity is represented under the umbrella of human rights. Many Muslim majority countries have signed international human rights treaties, but the impact of these largely remains to be seen in local legal systems.

Muslim liberals often reject traditional interpretations of Islamic law, which allows Ma malakat aymanukum and slavery. They say that slavery opposed Islamic principles which they believe to be based on justice and equality and some say that verses relating to slavery or "Ma malakat aymanukum" now can not be applied due to the fact that the world has changed, while others say that those verses are totally misinterpreted and twisted to legitimize slavery. In the 20th century, South Asian scholars Ghulam Ahmed Pervez and Amir Ali argued that the expression ma malakat aymanukum should be properly read in the past tense. When some called for reinstatement of slavery in Pakistan upon its independence from the British colonial rule, Pervez argued that the past tense of this expression means that the Quran had imposed "an unqualified ban" on slavery.

Liberal Muslims have argued against death penalty for apostasy based on the Quranic verse that "There shall be no compulsion in religion."

LGBT rights 

In January 2013, the Muslim Alliance for Sexual and Gender Diversity (MASGD) was launched. The organization was formed by members of the Queer Muslim Working Group, with the support of the National Gay and Lesbian Task Force. Several initial MASGD members previously had been involved with the Al-Fatiha Foundation, including Faisal Alam and Imam Daayiee Abdullah.

The Safra Project for women is based in the UK. It supports and works on issues relating to prejudice LGBTQ Muslim women. It was founded in October 2001 by Muslim LBT women. The Safra Project's "ethos is one of inclusiveness and diversity."

In Australia, Nur Wahrsage has been an advocate for LGBTI Muslims and founded Marhaba, a support group for queer Muslims in Melbourne, Australia. In May 2016, Wahrsage revealed that he is homosexual in an interview on SBS2’s The Feed, being the first openly gay Imam in Australia.

In Canada, Salaam was founded as the first gay Muslim organization in Canada and the second in the world. Salaam was found in 1993 by El-Farouk Khaki, who organized the Salaam/Al-Fateha International Conference in 2003.

In May 2009, the Toronto Unity Mosque / el-Tawhid Juma Circle was founded by Laury Silvers, a University of Toronto religious studies scholar, alongside Muslim gay-rights activists El-Farouk Khaki and Troy Jackson. Unity Mosque/ETJC is a gender-equal, LGBT+ affirming, mosque.

In November 2012, a prayer room was set up in Paris, France by gay Islamic scholar and founder of the group 'Homosexual Muslims of France' Ludovic-Mohamed Zahed. It was described by the press as the first gay-friendly mosque in Europe. The reaction from the rest of the Muslim community in France has been mixed, the opening has been condemned by the Grand Mosque of Paris.

Examples of Muslim LGBT media works are the 2006 Channel 4's documentary Gay Muslims, the film production company Unity Productions Foundation, the 2007 and 2015 documentary films A Jihad for Love and A Sinner in Mecca, both produced by Parvez Sharma, and the Jordanian LGBT publication My.Kali.

Secularism

The definition and application of secularism, especially the place of religion in society, varies among Muslim countries as it does among non-Muslim countries. As the concept of secularism varies among secularists in the Muslim world, reactions of Muslim intellectuals to the pressure of secularization also varies. On the one hand, secularism is condemned by some Muslim intellectuals who do not feel that religious influence should be removed from the public sphere. On the other hand, secularism is claimed by others to be compatible with Islam. For example, the quest for secularism has inspired some Muslim scholars who argue that secular government is the best way to observe sharia; "enforcing [sharia] through coercive power of the state negates its religious nature, because Muslims would be observing the law of the state and not freely performing their religious obligation as Muslims" says Abdullahi Ahmed An-Na'im, a professor of law at Emory University and author of Islam and the secular state : negotiating the future of Shariʻa. Moreover, some scholars  argue that secular states have existed in the Muslim world since the Middle Ages.

Egalitarianism

 Islam is often described as possessing a "decidedly egalitarian spirit", and "in principle egalitarian, recognizing no superiority of one believer over another by birth or descent, race or nationality, or social status", (slaves and women notwithstanding). Nonetheless, Muslims known as Sayyids (those accepted as descendants of the Islamic prophet Muhammad) have special privileges in Islam, notably of tax exemptions and a share in Khums.

Discrimination also exists in regards of intermarriage between persons of Arab and non-Arab lineages, as can be found in a number of fatwa sites. 
According to Darul Ifta Birmingham (Hanafi fiqh) quoting Raddul Muhtar: 'An Ajmi (non-Arab) cannot be a match for a woman of Arab descent, no matter that he be an Aalim (religious scholar) or even a Sultan (ruling authority).'
The website Islamic Virtues quotes the Shafi’i manual Reliance of the Traveller and Tools of the Worshipper: 'And the ajami (non-Arab) is not suitable for an Arab woman', ... " (the quote goes on to discourage marriages between Muslims of different tribes). 
Still another site ("Answered according to Shafi'i Fiqh by Qibla.com ... Answered by Shaykh Amjad Rasheed") states: "... most of the scholars do consider this aspect [i.e. lineage] for suitability, therefore a non-Arab is not suitable for an Arab. And a non-Qurayshi is not suitable for a Qurayshi woman  ... "

This is notably in direct contrast to the Prophet Muhammad's last sermon, "...All mankind is from Adam and Eve, an Arab has no superiority over a non-Arab nor a non-Arab has any superiority over an Arab; also a white has no superiority over a black nor a black has any superiority over white except by piety and good action."

Movements
 

Over the course of the 19th and 20th centuries, in accordance with their increasingly modern societies and outlooks, liberal Muslims have tended to reinterpret many aspects of the application of their religion in their life in an attempt to reconnect. This is particularly true of Muslims who now find themselves living in non-Muslim countries.

At least one observer (Max Rodenbeck) has noted several challenges to "reform"—i.e. accommodation with the enlightenment, reason and science, the separation of religion and politics—that the other two Abrahamic faiths did not have to grapple with: whereas Christian and Jewish reform evolved over centuries, in relatively organic and self-generated—albeit often bloody—fashion, the challenge to Islam of such concepts as empirical reasoning, the nation-state, the theory of evolution, and individualism arrived all in a heap and all too often at the point of a gun.

In addition, traditional sharia law has been shaped in all its complexity by serving for centuries as "the backbone" of legal systems of Muslim states, while millions of Muslim now live in non-Muslim states. Islam also lacks a "widely recognized religious hierarchy to explain doctrinal changes or to enforce them" because it has no [central] church.

Islamic Modernism

Islamic Modernism, also sometimes referred to as Modernist Salafism, is a movement that has been described as "the first Muslim ideological response" attempting to reconcile Islamic faith with modern Western values such as nationalism, democracy, civil rights, rationality, equality, and progress. It featured a "critical reexamination of the classical conceptions and methods of jurisprudence" and a new approach to Islamic theology and Quranic exegesis (Tafsir).

It was the first of several Islamic movements – including secularism, Islamism and Salafism – that emerged in the middle of the 19th century in reaction to the rapid changes of the time, especially the perceived onslaught of Western Civilization and colonialism on the Muslim world. Founders include Muhammad Abduh (1849-1905), a Sheikh of Al-Azhar University for a brief period before his death in 1905, Jamal ad-Din al-Afghani (1838-1897), and Sir Syed Ahmed Khan (1817-1898).

The early Islamic Modernists (al-Afghani and Muhammad Abdu) used the term "salafiyya" to refer to their attempt at renovation of Islamic thought, and this "salafiyya movement" is often known in the West as "Islamic modernism," although it is very different from what is currently called the Salafi movement, which generally signifies "ideologies such as wahhabism". Since its inception, Modernism has suffered from co-option of its original reformism by both secularist rulers and by "the official ulama" whose "task it is to legitimise" rulers' actions in religious terms.

Modernism differs from secularism in that it insists on the importance of religious faith in public life, and from Salafism or Islamism in that it embraces contemporary European institutions, social processes, and values.

Quranism

Quranists believe Muhammad himself was a Quranist and the founder of Quranism, and that his followers distorted the faith and split into schisms and factions such as Sunni, Shia, and Khawarij. Quranists reject the hadith and follow the Quran only. The extent to which Quranists reject the authenticity of the Sunnah varies, but the more established groups have thoroughly criticised the authenticity of the hadith and refused it for many reasons, the most prevalent being the Quranist claim that hadith is not mentioned in the Quran as a source of Islamic theology and practice, was not recorded in written form until more than two centuries after the death of the Muhammed, and contain perceived internal errors and contradictions.

Tolu-e-Islam

The movement was initiated by Muhammad Iqbal, and later spearheaded by Ghulam Ahmed Pervez. Ghulam Ahmed Pervez did not reject all hadiths; however, he only accepted hadiths which "are in accordance with the Quran or do not stain the character of the Prophet or his companions". The organization publishes and distributes books, pamphlets, and recordings of Pervez's teachings.

Tolu-e-Islam does not belong to any political party, nor does it belong to any religious group or sect.

Scriptural fallibility
Some Muslims (Saeed Nasheed, Abdul Karim Soroush, Sayyed Ahmad Al-Qabbanji, Hassan Radwan) have argued for taking "the bold step of challenging the very idea that the Qur’an and Sunna are infallible", and asserting that instead the Quran is "divinely inspired but ... human-authored". Saeed Nasheed writes,
"The Qur’an is not the speech of God, just as the loaf of bread is not the work of the farmer. God produced the raw material, which was inspiration, just as the farmer produces the raw material, which is wheat. But it is the baker who turns the wheat or flour into bread according to his own unique way, artistic expertise and creative ability. Thus it is the Prophet who was responsible for interpreting the inspiration and turning it into actual phrases and words according to his own unique view."

See also
 Cultural Muslim
 Islah
 Islam and modernity
 Islam and secularism
 Islamic revival
Jaringan Islam Liberal
 Modern Islamic philosophy
 Muslims for Progressive Values
Nahdlatul Ulama
 Ideology of Mahmoud Mohammed Taha

Notes

References

Further reading
 Safi, Omid, Progressive Islam, in Muhammad in History, Thought, and Culture: An Encyclopedia of the Prophet of God (2 vols.), Edited by C. Fitzpatrick and A. Walker, Santa Barbara, ABC-CLIO, 2014, Vol. II, pp. 486–490. 
Qur'an and Woman by Amina Wadud.
American Muslims: Bridging Faith and Freedom by M. A. Muqtedar Khan.
Charles Kurzman, ed. (1998). Liberal Islam: A Sourcebook. Oxford University Press, USA. .
Progressive Muslims: On Justice, Gender, and Pluralism, edited by Omid Safi.
"Debating Moderate Islam", edited by M. A. Muqtedar Khan.
Qur'an, Liberation and Pluralism by Farid Esack.
Revival and Reform in Islam by Fazlur Rahman Malik.
The Unthought in Contemporary Islamic Thought by Mohammed Arkoun.
Unveiling Traditions: Postcolonial Islam in a Polycentric World by Anouar Majid.
Islam and Science: Religious Orthodoxy and the Battle for Rationality by Pervez Hoodbhoy.
Islam is Mercy: Essential Features of a Modern Religion, by Mouhanad Khorchide 2012; English 2014.
The Viability of Islamic Science by S. Irfan Habib, Economic and Political Weekly, June 5, 2004.
 The Reformist Islamic Thinker Muhammad Shahrur: In the Footsteps of Averroes
 A Liberal Muslim Blog
Vanessa Karam, Olivia Samad and Ani Zonneveld, eds. (2011). Progressive Muslim Identities. Oracle Releasing. .
 Mustafa Akyol (2011). Islam Without Extremes: A Muslim Case for Liberty. W. W. Norton & Company. .

External links
Charles Kurzman's Liberal Islam links, compiled by the author of Liberal Islam: A Sourcebook.

 
Women's rights in Islam
LGBT Muslim organizations
LGBT and multiculturalism
I
I